Schwalbe (German for swallow) may refer to:

Technology
 Messerschmitt Me 262 Schwalbe, the first functional jet fighter
 Raab-Katzenstein KL.1 Schwalbe, German biplane produced in the 1920s
 Schwalbe (tire manufacturer), a brand name of Ralf Bohle GmbH
 Simson KR 51/2 Schwalbe, a motorcycle manufactured by Simson
 Schwalbe-class cruiser, German class of unprotected cruiser ships
 SMS Schwalbe, lead ship of the Schwalbe class

Medicine 

 Schwalbe's line, anatomical line on the interior surface of the eye's cornea, named for Gustav Schwalbe

Sports
 Die Schwalbe, a German chess composition society, and its magazine, Die Schwalbe
 FC Schwalbe Hannover, a German rugby union club
 Diving (association football), an attempt by a player to gain an unfair advantage by diving to the ground

Surname
 Ernst Schwalbe (1871–1920), German pathologist
 Felix Schwalbe (1892–1974), German Wehrmacht general
 Gustav Albert Schwalbe (1844-1916), German anatomist and anthropologist
 Gustav Christian Schwabe (1813–1897), German-born merchant and financier
 Harry O. Schwalbe (1874–1935), American businessman
 Ingeborg Schwalbe (1935), German athlete
 Mary Anne Schwalbe (1934–2009), American university administrator and refugee worker
 Michel Schwalbé (1919–2012), French-Polish violinist
 Nina Schwalbe (1966), American public health researcher 
 Ole Schwalbe (1929–1990), Danish painter
 William Schwalbe (1962), American author

Other uses
 , subcamp of the Buchenwald concentration camp in Berga / Elster